G. Keshava Pillai (July 1924 – 31 December 2021) was an Indian actor and army and naval officer known for his work in Malayalam cinema. He was active for 65 years, acting in more than 325 Malayalam films, and is known for revolutionising the role of the antagonist in Indian cinema and television. He was known for his acclaimed villain roles in Vadakkanpattu action films, historical films and other action films during the 70s and 80s. He took also many notable roles in family-focused films and TV shows. He is the only actor during the 80s to have accomplished most of his stunts in films without the use of stunt doubles.

Life and career
Pillai was born in Chirayinkeezhu in July 1924 to Perumpaattathil Govindapillai and Saraswathi Amma. He received his primary education from Chirayenkeezhu Sree Chithira Thirunal High School. He was married to the late Princess of Edava, Ulpalakshiyamma, and has six children named; K Prathapachandran, Sreekala R Nair, Sreelekha Mohan, Sreekumari B Pilla, Chandramohanan and K Priyadarshanan. His debut movie was Snehaseema in 1954. He joined Indian military before entering films. He served in both the Indian Army and the Indian Navy, and is a decorated veteran of WWII. After a long career in films, he began to act in TV serials too. His TV debut was in the serial 'Aakaasaththile Paravakal ', directed by Madhupal  and telecast in Kairali TV. He later appeared in many TV serials. His portrayal in the serial 'Kumkumapoovu' got wide attention. Princess Ulpalakshiamma, his wife, died in 2011. Pillai died at his home in Edava on 31 December 2021 at the age of 97.

Awards

G. K. Pillai has secured hundreds of awards in his career, but notably received these prestigious awards: 
2005  Best Character Actor (for his role in serial :Megham)–Asianet television awards
 2011 Madras Film Fans Association
 2011 Jayan Ragamalika Award
 2011 Prem Nazir Award
 2012 Lifetime Achievement Award (for his role in Kumkumapoovu )- Asianet Television Awards 2012
2016  Lifetime Achievement Award (for his roles in several serials  )- Flowers Television Awards
2018  Lifetime Achievement Award (for his roles in several serials  )- Janmabhoomi Television Awards

Filmography

 Snehaseema (1954) as Pooppally Thomas
 Manthravaadi (1956)
 Deva Sundari (1957)
 Achanum Makanum (1957)
 Minnunnathellam Ponnalla (1957)
 Nairu Pidicha Pulivalu (1958) as Gopi
 Arappavan (1961)
 Jnaana Sundari (1961) as King Shimayon
 Ummini Thanka (1961) as Raman Thampi
 Shree Rama Pattabhishekam (1962)
 Vidhi Thanna Vilakku (1962)
 Veluthambi Dalawa (1962)
 Swargarajyam (1962)
 Snapaka Yohannan (1963) as Pilate
 Kalayum Kaaminiyum (1963)
 Kadathukaran (1965) as Rajan
 Rajamalli (1965)
 Kavyamela (1965) as Dr.Panikkar
 Kalithozhan (1966)
 Puthri (1966) as Chackochan
 Sthanarthi Saramma (1966) as Thomachan
 Kanakachilanka (1966)
 Tharavattamma (1966) as Madhavankutty
 Kadamattathachan (1966)
 Ashwamedham (1967) as Mohanan's Father
 Bhagyamudra (1967)
 Ollathu Mathi (1967)
 Pooja (1967)
 Chithramela (1967)
 Paathira Pattu (1967)
 Kottayam Kolacase (1967)
 Cochin Express (1967)
 Kanaatha Veshangal (1967)
 Inspector (1968)
 Punnapra Vayalar (1968) as SI Rajan
 Lakshaprabhu (1968)
 Kaayalkkarayil (1968)
 Anchusundarikal (1968)
 Padunna Puzha (1968) as Govinda Pilla
 Agnipareeksha (1968) as Krishna Kuruppu
 Danger Biscuit (1969) as K.J.Pillai
 Kannoor Deluxe (1969) as K B Pilla
 Moodalmanju (1970) as Chandrasekharan Nair
 Naazhikakkallu (1970)
 Ezhuthaatha Kadha (1970)
 Othenente Makan (1970) as Kunkan
 Lottery Ticket (1970)
 Mindaapennu (1970) as Kunjikelu Menon
 Kaakkathampuraatti (1970)
 Vimochanasamaram (1971)
 Agnimrigam (1971)
 Yogamullaval (1971)
 Panchavan Kaadu (1971) as Thanu Pilla
 Aromalunni (1972)
 Nrithasaala (1972) as Vamban Velayudan 
 Maaya (1972) as Panki Pilla
 Jesus (1973)
 Thenaruvi (1973)
 Football Champion (1973) as John Stephen
 Ponnapuram Kotta (1973)
 Thumbolarcha (1974) as Udayappa Chekavar
 Durga (1974)
 Udyaanalakshmi (1976)
 Seemanthaputhran (1976)
 Light House (1976)
 Aval Oru Devaalayam (1977)
 Sreemad Bhagavadgeetha (1977)
 Kaduvaye Pidicha Kiduva (1977)
 Thacholi Ambu (1978)
 Kadathanaattu Maakkam (1978)
 Aanakkalari (1978)
 Aanappaachan (1978)
 Raju Rahim (1978)
 Irumbazhikal (1979) as Sankara Pilla
 Choola (1979)
 Lava (1980) as Police officer
 Paalaattu Kunjikkannan (1980)
 Chora Chuvanna Chora (1980)
 Chandrahaasam (1980)
 Deepam (1980)
 Vedikkettu (1980)
 Sanchari (1981) as Keshavan
 Avathaaram (1981) as Parameshwaran Pilla
 Valarthumrigangal (1981)
 Manassinte Theerthayaathra (1981)
 Orikkalkkoodi (1981)
 Ankuram (1982)
 Ee Nadu (1982) as Joshi John
 Padayottam (1982)
 Vidhichathum Kothichathum (1982)
 Jambulingam (1982)
 Rathilayam (1983)
 Iniyenkilum (1983)
 Aazhi (1985)
 Vellam (1985)
 Kulambadikal (1986)
 August 1 (1988)
 Ee Raavil (2001)
 Kanavu (2002)
 Madhuram (2002)
 Koottu (2004)
 Mukhamariyaathe (2006)
 NaalU Pennungal (2007)
 Thathwamasi  (2009)
 Njaan Sanchaari (2010)
 Kaaryasthan (2010)
 The Metro (2011)
 Warning (2012)
 Anavaranam (2012)
 Manikya Thamburattiyum Christmas Carolum (2013)
 Loka Samastha (2015)
 Elinjikkavu PO (2015)
 Chirakodinja Kinavukal (2015)
 Thinkal Muthal Velli Vare (2015)
Vishwa Vikhyatharaya Payyanmar (2017)
Nimisham (2018)
Ente Sathyanweshana Pareekshakal (2019)

Television
 2001 - Porutham (Surya TV)
 2005 -Kadamattathu Kathanar (TV series) (Asianet)
 2004 - Megham (Asianet)
 2006 - Ammamanassu (Asianet)
2009-2010- Ente Manasaputhri (Asianet)
2009-Pakalmazha (Amrita TV)
 2010 - Autograph (Asianet)
 2010- Mattoruval (Surya TV)
 2011- 2014 - Kumkumapoovu (Asianet)
 2011- Ividam Swargamanu (Surya TV)
 2011- Veera Marthanda Varma (Surya TV)
 2012- Manasaveena (Mazhavil Manorama)
 2013- Chattambi Kalyani( Jai hind)
 2014- Avalude Katha (Surya TV)
 2015- Dhathuputhri (Mazhavil Manorama)
 2015- Spandhanam (Surya TV)
 2017-2018 :Mamangam (Flowers TV)
 Aanineyum Pennineyum Kurichu (DD Malayalam) - telefilm
 2019 -Thamarathumbi - (Surya TV)

References

External links

G. K. Pillai at MSI

1924 births
2021 deaths
Indian male film actors
Male actors from Thiruvananthapuram
Male actors in Malayalam cinema
20th-century Indian male actors
21st-century Indian male actors
Indian male television actors
Male actors in Malayalam television